Julian Börner (born 21 January 1991) is a German professional footballer who plays as a defender for Hannover 96.

Bundesliga in August 2009, but did not make his next appearance for the club for over two years. He suffered relegation to the 3. Liga with Cottbus in 2014 and signed for fellow 3. Liga club Arminia Bielefeld in June 2014. He was promoted to the 2. Bundesliga in his first season with the club an appointed club captain in summer 2017. He transferred to English Championship club Sheffield Wednesday in 2019.

Club career

Early career
In August 2009, he signed for 2. Bundesliga club Energie Cottbus on a three-year deal. He made his debut for the club and only appearance of the 2009–10 season as a substitute in a 3–1 home defeat to Greuther Fürth on 23 August 2009. He failed to make a first team during the 2010–11 season, but did appear twice for the reserve team in the Regionalliga Nord. Having suffered from multiple injury problems during his first two seasons at the club, he made his second first-team appearance as a starter in a 0–0 draw with FC Ingolstadt 04 on 27 November 2011, before being substituted in the 67th-minute. During the 2011–12 season, he made 4 first-team appearances during the and 11 reserve team appearances, scoring twice for the reserve team. In March 2012, Börner extended his contract with the club by a further two years.

Börner scored his first goal in the 2. Bundesliga on 24 November 2012 with the club's second goal of a 3–1 win over Eintracht Braunschweig. He received the first red card of his career on 24 February 2013 for a challenge on Ramon Machado, resulting in a three-match ban. On 29 March 2016, his contract with the club was extended to 30 March 2016. He returned to first team action on 21 April 2013 for a 1–0 defeat to Dynamo Dresden, but was again sent off for a foul on Filip Trojan. Börner scored once in 15 first-team appearances during the 2012–13 season, whilst he scored one goal in 9 matches for the reserve team. Börner featured in the first nine matches of the 2013–14 season before dropping out of the matchday squad, returning to the starting line-up for the 16th matchday. He was sent off against SV Sandhausen in the 20th matchday, before returning for the final two matches of the season, with Börner making 18 appearances in all competitions as Cottbus finished bottom of the 2. Bundesliga and were relegated to the 3. Liga.

Arminia Bielefeld
In June 2014, Börner signed for fellow relegated 3. Liga side Arminia Bielefeld on a one-year deal. He made his debut for the club on 26 July 2014, starting in the opening match of the season as Bielefeld won 2–1 away at Mainz 05 II. He scored his first goal for the club on 27 August 2014 with a headed goal in a 1–1 draw against MSV Duisburg, before scoring his second goal for the club the following week in a 4–2 win over Stuttgarter Kickers. He received his first sending off for the club on 28 September 2014 for a challenge on Manuel Zeitz in a 1–1 draw with Energie Cottbus, with the sending off resulting in a three-match ban. Across the 2014–15 season, he scored 4 goals in 25 league matches as Bielefeld finished top of the 3. Liga and were promoted back to the 2. Bundesliga. He also made 4 appearances in the 2014–15 DFB-Pokal as the club were eliminated in the semi-final following a 4–0 defeat to VfL Wolfsburg.

Börner started 17 of Bielefeld's 19 matches prior to the winter break. On 6 January 2016, his contract with the club was extended until 2019. He scored his first goal of the season on 28 February 2016 with the final goal of a 3–2 defeat to 1. FC Heidenheim, before scoring his second and final goal of the season against Greuther Fürth on 24 April 2016. He made 31 2. Bundesliga appearances and 1 DFB-Pokal appearance over the course of the 2015–16 season. It took Börner until the 23rd matchday to score his first goal of the 2016–17 season, but he scored 5 goals in the final 11 matches of the season as the club finished 15th, avoiding the relegation play-offs by one point and automatic relegation by three points. The 2016–17 season saw Börner score 5 times across 30 matches in all competitions.

In summer 2017, he became club captain at Arminia, narrowly beating previous captain Fabian Klos in a vote amongst the playing squad. During the 2017–18 season, Börner played 28 times and scored 4 goals, and scored 3 goals in 27 matches in the 2018–19 season. Despite a verbal agreement that Börner would sign a new contract with the club, he rejected the offer of a new contract with a view to playing football in England.

Sheffield Wednesday
On 10 July 2019, Börner joined Championship club Sheffield Wednesday on a contract of undisclosed length following his departure from Arminia Bielefeld, and made his debut for the club on 3 August 2019, starting in the club's 3–1 away victory over Reading. He scored his first goal for the club on 18 October 2019 with a 19th-minute volley in a 1–1 draw with Cardiff City. He was nominated for the Championship Player of the Month award for October 2019, though the award was instead given to Aleksandar Mitrović of Fulham. Despite missing out on the award, Börner was praised by manager Garry Monk, who claimed that "how he has handled that transition [to English football] has been really impressive". Prior to the suspension of the campaign in March 2020 due to the COVID-19 pandemic, Börner had made 33 appearances and scored 1 goal, and made a further 7 appearances without scoring during the remainder of the 2019–20 season.

Sheffield Wednesday were deducted 12 points for the 2020–21 season, though that was reduced to six points after an appeal. It took Börner until 24 October 2020 to make his first league appearance of the season, but he then held down a regular first team place due to injuries to the club's other centre-backs. He suffered a facial injury in the club's 2–0 defeat to Huddersfield Town on 8 December 2020, returning from injury for the club's 3–0 FA Cup defeat to Everton on 24 January 2021. He was sent off for the first time for Wednesday on 6 March 2021 in a 3–0 defeat to Reading for a foul on George Pușcaș in the penalty area, with Reading converting the resulting penalty to score the first goal of the match. He scored three goals in his final 8 matches of the season, including one on the final day against Derby County that looked to spare the club from relegation as they were relegated to League One after finishing 24th. On 7 June 2021, Bild has said that Börner would be joining 2. Bundesliga club, Hannover 96 on a free transfer, despite him still having a year of his Sheffield Wednesday contract remaining. On the 23 June 2021, Hannover 96 had announced that Borner had signed a contract with them, however Wednesday have not yet given him clearance in signing for them with reports that Wednesday now wanted a fee for the player.

Hannover 96
On 2 August 2021, Börner would complete a move to German side Hannover 96 for an undisclosed fee.

International career
Börner is a German youth international, having represented his country at under-16, under-17 and under-18 level.

Style of play
Börner plays as a left-sided central defender but can also play as a central midfielder. His style of play has been described as "no-nonsense".

Personal life
He is married to former footballer  and their daughter Emma was born in May 2017.

Career statistics

References

External links

1991 births
Living people
German footballers
Germany youth international footballers
Association football midfielders
FC Rot-Weiß Erfurt players
FC Energie Cottbus II players
FC Energie Cottbus players
Arminia Bielefeld players
Sheffield Wednesday F.C. players
Hannover 96 players
2. Bundesliga players
3. Liga players
English Football League players